Piedmont is a small city located in Alameda County, California, United States, completely surrounded by the city of Oakland. Its residential population was 11,270 at the 2020 census. The name comes from the region of Piedmont in Italy, and it means 'foothill'. Piedmont was incorporated in 1907, and was developed significantly in the 1920s and 1930s.

History 

The original neighborhood of Piedmont was larger than the current municipality of Piedmont, with the Mountain View Cemetery considered full part of the Piedmont neighborhood.

Residents initially sought incorporation in 1907. Two elections were held among the citizens of Piedmont in 1907, both of which narrowly upheld the decision for Piedmont to become a separate city, rather than become a neighborhood within the city of Oakland.

Like surrounding Oakland, Piedmont has a history of racial segregation. In 1924, the city's first African-American homeowners, Sidney and Irene Dearing, got around the city's restrictive housing covenants by purchasing a home using a white family member as a proxy. They could not count on the city of Piedmont to protect them from violent threats against their lives—the chief of police at the time, Burton Becker, was an active member of the Ku Klux Klan. While the Dearings initially refused to leave, bombs were left around their property. They sold it to the city for $25,000 after a mob surrounded their home and demanded that they leave.

Before 1968, restrictive housing covenants and redlining were used to exclude non-whites in the city for many years. The American sociologist and historian James W. Loewen identified Piedmont as a "probable" sundown town, meaning that non-whites were not welcome after dusk and could face violence and intimidation. While surrounding Oakland is one of the most ethnically and culturally diverse cities in the United States, Piedmont has a less racially diverse population than Oakland. Attempts to ethnically and culturally diversify the city and allow for higher density and affordable housing are typically met with resistance from the city's residents.

In early 2021, the city council indicated that it intended "to move forward with public acknowledgement and an apology for the abhorrent treatment Sidney Dearing and his family received in 1924."

According to the city's Web page, "In the Roaring Twenties, Piedmont was known as the 'City of Millionaires' because there were more millionaires per square mile than in any city in the United States." Many of these millionaires built mansions that still stand, notably on Sea View Avenue and Sotelo Avenue/Glen Alpine Road in 'Alta' Piedmont. Piedmont became a charter city under the laws of the state of California on December 18, 1922. On February 27, 1923, voters adopted the charter, which can only be changed by another vote of the people.

Piedmont celebrated the year 2007 as its Centennial Anniversary since incorporation. The Centennial Committee hosted celebratory events along a trail that ran through downtown Piedmont and denoted historical landmarks in the city. The Committee also created a float for the city's Fourth of July parade.

The historical exhibit "A Deluxe Autonomy: Piedmont’s First 100 Years" was on display in the Oakland Public Library from January 5 to March 31, 2007.

In August 2017, the mayor of Piedmont, Jeffrey Wieler, resigned after it was revealed he had made disparaging Facebook posts about Black Lives Matter and transgender people.

Geography 

It is located near the Hayward Fault, a geological fault line that runs through the East Bay region.

Borders 
Piedmont is surrounded on all sides by the city of Oakland. Specifically, Piedmont's northwestern border is adjacent to Oakland's Piedmont Ave commercial district.  Piedmont borders Oakland's historic Grand Lake District (Lakeshore and Grand Avenue commercial districts) to the southwest, the quaint and rustic Montclair District to the northeast, and the Crocker Highlands and Glenview Districts to the south.

Major streets 
Piedmont's major streets include Oakland Avenue, which runs east-west through Piedmont's small city center; Highland Avenue, which divides Piedmont into upper and lower sections; Moraga Avenue, which runs along the city's northern border; and Grand Avenue, which runs near Piedmont's western border and further distinguishes 'Lower' Piedmont (west of Highland Ave) from 'Baja' Piedmont (west of Grand Ave). Lots in upper Piedmont are, on average, larger than lots in lower Piedmont. A nearby shopping district on Piedmont Avenue is located in Oakland, not Piedmont. A small shopping hamlet had been located on Highland Avenue near the Exedra at Piedmont Park for many years, but in the last few decades has dwindled in number to a small, local grocer-deli (Mulberry's Market), a service station and three banks. No major highways run within Piedmont's borders, but entrances to CA Highway 13  and CA I-580 are quite near.

Housing 
Piedmont is almost entirely zoned for single-family dwelling residential use. Piedmont has minimal commerce compared with statistically similar cities and relies primarily on property taxes and fees for public revenues to support public services.  The city also has relatively few multi-family or second (in-law) units. The city has a very small number of businesses in its commercial district on Highland Avenue and a very small number of businesses on Grand Avenue near Piedmont's western border with Oakland.

Emergency services 

Piedmont provides its own fire, police, parks, and recreational services but does not have its own public library nor federal post office; these services are shared with Oakland. Special, incremental property tax assessments on Piedmont real estate for schools and some public services are not shared with Oakland.

Demographics

2010 
The 2010 United States Census reported that Piedmont had a population of 10,667. The racial makeup of Piedmont was 7,917 (74.2%) White, 144 (1.3%) African American, 6 (0.1%) Native American, 1,939 (18.2%) Asian, 13 (0.1%) Pacific Islander, 94 (0.9%) from other races, and 554 (5.2%) from two or more races. Hispanic or Latino of any race were 421 persons (3.9%). The Census reported that 10,664 people (100% of the population) lived in households, three (0%) lived in non-institutionalized group quarters, and none (0%) was institutionalized.

There were 3,801 households, out of which 1,606 (42.3%) had children under the age of 18 living in them, 2,738 (72.0%) were opposite-sex married couples living together, 260 (6.8%) had a female head of household with no spouse present, 119 (3.1%) had a male head of household with no spouse present.  There were 67 (1.8%) unmarried opposite-sex partnerships, and 38 (1.0%) same-sex married couples or partnerships. 578 households (15.2%) consisted of an individual householder, and 344 (9.1%) were senior (age 65+) individual householders.  There were 3,117 families (82.0% of all households); the average family size was 3.11.

The age distribution of Piedmont's population is diverse with 3,017 people (28.3%) under the age of 18, 451 people (4.2%) aged 18 to 24, 1,638 people (15.4%) aged 25 to 44, 3,922 people (36.8%) aged 45 to 64, and 1,639 people (15.4%) who were 65 years of age or older.  The median age was 46.2 years. For every 100 females, there were 94.7 males.  For every 100 females age 18 and over, there were 89.8 males.

There were 3,924 housing units, with an average household size of 2.81.  Piedmont's average housing-unit density is 2,339.1 units per square mile (903.1/km2), of which 3,801 were occupied.  Piedmont had 3,358 (88.3%) owner-occupied housing units, and 443 (11.7%) renter-occupied housing units. The homeowner vacancy rate was 0.5%; the rental vacancy rate was 3.7%.  9,393 people (88.1% of the population) lived in owner-occupied housing units and 1,271 people (11.9%) lived in rental housing units.

2000 
As of the census of 2000, there were 10,952 people, 3,804 households, and 3,104 families residing in the city. The population density was 6,488.7 inhabitants per square mile (2,502.1/km2).

There were 3,804 households, 47.3% containing children under the age of 18, 70.9% were married couples living together, 8.5% had a female householder with no spouse present, and 18.4% were other family configurations.  14.5% of all households consisted of individuals, and 7.8% were households consisting of senior (age 65+ years) individuals. The average household size was 2.88, and the average family size was 3.18.

According to the 2000 U.S. Census,  the age distribution of Piedmont's population was spread, with 30.3% of residents under the age of 18, 3.8% aged 18 to 24 years, 18.5% aged 25 to 44 years, 34.0% aged 45 to 64 years, and 13.5% aged 65+ years. The median age was 44 years. For every 100 females, there were 92.7 males.  For every 100 females age 18 and over, there were 87.8 males.

The median income for a household in the city was $134,270, and the median income for a family was $149,857. Males had a median income of $100,000 versus $58,553 for females.  The per capita income for the city was $70,539.  About 1.0% of families and 2.0% of the population were below the poverty line, including 2.6% of those under age 18 and 1.6% of those aged 65 or over.

Arts and culture 

Piedmont has a City Hall, a Community Hall, a Veterans' Memorial Building, a Recreation Center, Aquatics Center, and Center for the Arts. Public parks include Piedmont Park, Dracena Park, Crocker Park, Hampton Park, Linda Ave Tot Lot and Dog Run, Kennelly Skate Park, and Blair Park.  Playfields include Coaches Playfield, Linda Playfield, and Piedmont Sports Field (at Hampton Park).

Regular town events include the July 4th Parade, Movies in the Park, Harvest Festival, Haunted House, Thanksgiving Turkey Trot, and Christmas Tree Lighting. Piedmont High School's annual Bird Calling Contest was previously featured on The Tonight Show Starring Johnny Carson and the Late Show with David Letterman.

Active charities and community groups include the Piedmont Education Foundation, the Piedmont Historical Society, the Piedmont Center for the Arts, the Piedmont Beautification Foundation, the Daughters of the American Revolution (Piedmont Chapter), the Piedmont League of Women Voters, Dress Best for Less, the Piedmont Highlanders Drums & Pipes, the Piedmont Civic Association, the Piedmont Community Church, the Piedmont East Bay Children's Choir, the Piedmont-Montclair Rotary Club, the Piedmont Boy Scouts, the Piedmont Baseball Foundation, the Piedmont Basketball Foundation, and the Piedmont Soccer Club. The Children's Support League holds annual Heart of the Home tours of Oakland and Piedmont homes.

Politics 

According to the California Secretary of State, as of February 10, 2019, Piedmont has 8,535 registered voters. Of those, 5,082 (59.5%) are registered Democrats, 1,173 (13.7%) are registered Republicans, and 2,022 (23.7%) have declined to state a political party.

From its incorporation until 1992, Piedmont was a Republican stronghold in presidential elections.

Education 

Elementary and secondary students (PK-12) residing in Piedmont, children of City of Piedmont employees, and children of Piedmont Unified School District employees are eligible to attend schools within the Piedmont Unified School District. The district, coinciding with the municipal boundaries, includes three elementary schools (Havens, Beach, and Wildwood), one middle school (Piedmont Middle School), and two high schools—one larger (Piedmont High School), and one smaller, alternative high school, Millennium High School. A very high percentage of Piedmont High School graduates are accepted to 4-year undergraduate programs. Many graduates continue their post-secondary education at very prestigious and competitive public and private colleges and universities.

The Piedmont Unified School District currently ranks #68 of 756 districts in the state of California according to one statistical analysis of California public education.

Piedmont voters have approved several local bond measures earmarked for maintaining and/or improving PUSD's educational facilities. For instance, Witter Field, PUSD's sports complex, was rebuilt between 1996 and 1999. The city-owned field adjacent to Beach Elementary School was resurfaced with natural cork-based artificial turf in early 2015. The PUSD-owned artificial turf field at Havens Elementary School (Becker Playfield) was placed in 2010.

Most recently, with the passage of Measure E in 2006, voters authorized the Piedmont Unified School District to issue up to $56 million in bonds to improve Piedmont public school buildings to reduce dangers from earthquakes, eliminate major collapse risks, and to meet or exceed all current state and federal seismic safety standards.

In addition to the public bond measures approved for PUSD facility upgrades and modernization, Piedmont voters have quadrennially approved, since 1980, a supplemental parcel tax (collected annually) which accounts for a very significant portion of PUSD's basic operational budget.  In 2005, two measures were approved by voters, one of which renewed the basic school district parcel tax, paying for 21% of the district's budget, and another which added an incremental amount, short-term, to compensate for reduced funding from mainly state, and some federal, sources. Piedmont's most recent school support tax, Measure A, was again approved by 88% of Piedmont voters in 2012. Due to further reductions in state education budgets during the Great Recession (2008-2011), state diversions from local school property tax allocations since 2004, and shifting of state financial responsibilities onto local school districts, Piedmont's local school parcel tax now represents 30% of PUSD's annual operating budget.

Piedmont High School hosts the annual Leonard J. Waxdeck Bird Calling Contest every spring, with the top three winners appearing on the Late Show with David Letterman and performing their bird calls.

The Piedmont Educational Foundation awards a number of grants for academic innovation in Piedmont schools each year, and provides a source of operational funding for the PUSD through its Endowment Fund which reached $6 million in 2015.

Media 
The city is served by two local weekly newspapers: the Piedmont Post and the Piedmonter, a neighborhood newspaper organized under the Contra Costa Times news organization.

Transportation 

AC Transit provides Piedmont with bus service. Bus routes 12 and 33 connect Piedmont to Oakland's BART stations. In addition to Route 33 serving BART stations, the route serves Upper Piedmont going to Estates Drive on weekdays. AC Transit also provides a Transbay bus. Route P, to the Transbay Terminal in Downtown San Francisco during peak commute hours.

In popular culture 
 The city appeared in the Disney show Gravity Falls as the hometown of the main characters Dipper and Mabel Pines.

Notable people 

Piedmont is home to a number of notable individuals in the political, business, sports, and academic communities, including: ex-Major League Baseball player David McCarty; ex-National Football League player Bubba Paris, San Francisco 49ers;  ex-National Football League player Bill Romanowski; Ambassador to Australia Jeff Bleich; Pete Docter, director of Pixar's Monsters, Inc., Up, and Inside Out and co-writer of WALL-E; Alex Hirsch, the creator of the animated television series Gravity Falls; and Billie Joe Armstrong, lead singer of Green Day. The punk rock band SWMRS also has its roots in Piedmont.

Author Jack London wrote Call of the Wild while living on Blair Avenue in a house that exists today; since this predated incorporation, technically he was never a citizen of Piedmont. John F. Kennedy's Secretary of Defense Robert S. McNamara grew up in Piedmont, where his family lived on Annerley Road. Clint Eastwood resided in Piedmont and attended Piedmont schools. Country Joe McDonald resided in Piedmont in the 1970s. Actors Dean Butler (Little House on the Prairie) also grew up in Piedmont. Notable tennis player and coach Brad Gilbert grew up in Piedmont.  Professional male professional tennis player Mackenzie "Mackie" McDonald grew up in Piedmont and attended Piedmont HS. Charles R. Schwab, founder of the discount stock brokerage firm bearing his name, and his family also lived in Piedmont in the early 1980s, as did Dean Witter, founder of Dean Witter Reynolds brokerage, in the 1940s.

Other residents have included: F. Wayne Valley, philanthropist, construction magnate, owner of the Oakland Raiders and founding member of the AFL; Frank C. Havens, for whom Havens Elementary School is named; and James Gamble, president of the Western Union Telegraph Company, who, in 1877, founded the Piedmont Land Company, introducing the name adopted by the city upon incorporation.

Actors, entertainment, and film professionals 

 Mark Andrews, Academy Award- and Golden Globe-winning film director
 Alice Dinnean, puppeteer
 Clint Eastwood, actor
 Chloe Fineman, actress, comedian "Saturday Night Live"
Alex Hirsch, creator of animated series Gravity Falls
 Wes Nisker, radio personality
Cynthia Stevenson, actress
Zhaoming Wu, painter

Academia 

 James Clifford, academia, historian
 Adam J. Matzger, academia, chemist

Artists and designers 

 Micaela Martinez DuCasse, artist
Erin Fetherston, designer
 Elsie Whitaker Martinez, artist
 Xavier Martínez, artist
Gyo Obata, architect

Business 

 Ruth Leach Amonette, the first woman to become a vice president at IBM. Ruth was raised in and attended high school in Piedmont.
Robert McNamara, American businessman and Secretary of Defense under President John F. Kennedy
Arun Sarin, ex-CEO of Vodafone
George Zimmer, businessman, Men's Wearhouse
Lip-Bu Tan, businessman, resides in Piedmont.

Poets, writers, and journalists 

 Richard Carlson, author
 William F. Knowland, publisher of The Oakland Tribune
 Joan London, writer
 Asieh Namdar, television journalist
 George Sterling, poet and playwright
 Herman Whitaker, writer

Sports 

 Peter Cornell, NBA player and agent
 Al Davis, football executive
Sonny Dykes, former head coach of the University of California football team, currently the head coach at Southern Methodist University
 Cuonzo Martin, former head coach of the University of California basketball team, currently head coach of the University of Missouri
Ashley Paris, basketball player
 Courtney Paris, basketball player

Others 

 Burton Becker, Piedmont Police Department Chief, Alameda County Sheriff, Ku Klux Klan member and later in life he served as an inmate.
 David C. Waybur, decorated soldier

References

External links 

 

 
1907 establishments in California
Cities in Alameda County, California
Cities in the San Francisco Bay Area
Incorporated cities and towns in California
Enclaves in the United States
Populated places established in 1907
Racial segregation
Sundown towns in California